Judy Byron is a multimedia artist and activist based in Washington, D.C.  Her work has been recognized by the National Endowment for the Arts, the Mid Atlantic Arts Foundation and the DC Commission on the Arts and Humanities.

Early life and education 
Byron was born in North Syracuse, New York and grew up in a working-class Italian Irish family. She received her bachelor's degree in speech and drama from Ithaca College in Ithaca, NY and studied printmaking at the Corcoran School of the Arts and Design in Washington, D.C.

After receiving her B.A., Byron volunteered for Gene McCarthy and the California farm workers. When she moved to Washington, D.C., Judy Byron worked as a teacher at Cardozo High School. She is married to photographer Rick Reinhard.

Art 
Byron has consciously moved away from traditional gallery spaces and displays her work in public spaces and her home. Byron's work consists of mostly drawings and portraits and she engages in an interactive process with the people and spaces represented in her work. For example, in her project “One to One” (1992–1993) Byron worked with DC-area teenagers to create large portraits; she visited them at a place in which they were comfortable and documented the moment with photographs. The teenagers then visited Byron's studio as she created these portraits and took part in a writing workshop with playwright and artist Rebecca Rice.

Byron has collaborated with other artists throughout her projects, such as poet Chasen Gaver and, as mentioned above, Rebecca Rice.

Byron uses a variety of materials, such as crayon, wood, and paper. She has employed several techniques for her projects, such as printmaking, engraving, woodcutting, and photography. Her art focuses around themes of identity, belonging, growing up, and everyday rural or city life.

In 1993, Byron received a $33,000 commission from the North Carolina Council for the Arts to create sixteen woodblock rubbings based on photos of North Carolinians. For the project, Byron spent two weeks traveling in North Carolina taking the photographs she would use for carving the woodblocks.

Corcoran Artist Mentorship Program 
Judy Byron studied at the Corcoran School of the Arts and Design and later taught a course in “collaborative art”. She later founded the Corcoran Artist Mentorship Program, which was recognized by the National Endowment for the Arts and the President's Committee on the Arts and Humanities.

Activism 
In the 1980s, Byron was involved in starting the DC-based group, Black Artists/White Artists, which met to discuss issues of race and art.

Judy Byron's activism is incorporated into her artistic projects. Her project “One to One” incorporated a mentorship component for the teenagers who participated, including journal-writing workshops. In 1988, Byron created a woodcut for an AIDS awareness campaign with the slogan “AIDS touches us all”, which was displayed around Washington, DC.

References

External links 

 

American women artists
American contemporary artists
American activists
American portrait artists
Ithaca College alumni
Year of birth missing (living people)
Living people
Artists from Syracuse, New York
Multimedia artists
Women multimedia artists
Photographers from Washington, D.C.
Corcoran School of the Arts and Design alumni
Artists from Washington, D.C.